James Stephen "Murr" Murray (born May 1, 1976) is an American improvisational comedian, actor, author, and producer from the New York City borough of Staten Island. He is a member of The Tenderloins, a comedy troupe also consisting of Brian Quinn, Sal Vulcano, and formerly Joe Gatto. Along with the other members of The Tenderloins, he stars in the television series Impractical Jokers, which premiered December 15, 2011, on TruTV.

Early life 
Murray was raised in the borough Staten Island in New York City and is of Irish and Italian descent. He attended Monsignor Farrell High School in that borough, meeting his future comedy partners Joe Gatto, Brian Quinn, and Sal Vulcano there in freshman year. He graduated in 1994. Murray later graduated from Georgetown University, in Washington, D.C.

Career

Early career 
In 1998, Murray produced, wrote, and directed a film titled Damned!, starring Jeremy Guskin as Jesus in an alternate retelling of Bible. Rather than paying for a Ford Taurus, Murray's parents paid for the production of this film at his request.

After being apart for years, Murray, Gatto, and Vulcano reunited after graduating from college and began practicing improvisation at Gatto's house, going on to tour as an improv & sketch comedy troupe in 1999, and calling themselves The Tenderloins.

The Tenderloins began producing comedy sketches together, posting them on YouTube, MySpace, and Metacafe, and subsequently accumulating millions of views online. In 2007, the troupe won the $100,000 grand prize in NBC's "It's Your Show" competition for the sketch "Time Thugs".

Impractical Jokers and other television shows 
Impractical Jokers premiered on December 15, 2011, on TruTV, which was watched by over 32 million viewers in its first season. The show has become the most popular series on TruTV.

In 2019, Murray, along with the other members of The Tenderloins, starred in The Misery Index, which is hosted by Jameela Jamil and is based on Andy Breckman's card game "Shit Happens".

Impractical Jokers: The Movie was released on February 21, 2020.

Other ventures 
Murray worked at NorthSouth Productions, where he was the senior vice president of development, leaving in February 2018. In 2018, he released a sci-fi/horror novel entitled Awakened, which was co-written by Darren Wearmouth, and revolves around the discovery of an intensely hostile race of intelligent, methane-breathing monsters living beneath the New York City Subway and the sinister Foundation for Human Advancement - an almost equally cruel and ruthless organization dedicated to the destruction of that race through world domination. A sequel, called The Brink, was released in 2019. In 2020, Murray and Wearmouth co-wrote another horror novel, Don't Move, which follows a group of campers being hunted by a giant arachnid. In 2021 they published a thriller, The Stowaway, about a serial killer on board a cruise ship.

In 2021, Murray began a solo standup tour, Murr Live. The family-friendly show consists of stories relating to the TV show, videos, and hidden camera challenges.

Personal life 
As a result of a triple punishment on Impractical Jokers, Murray has a tattoo of a ferret skydiving as a reference to an earlier punishment. On March 13, 2014, Murray married Sal Vulcano's sister, Jenna Vulcano, as a result of Sal's punishment in the season 3 finale, "Brother-in-Loss"; they annulled the marriage shortly after.

In 2019, Murray became engaged to Melyssa Davies, whom he met at his launch party for his book Awakened. Murray married Davies on September 25, 2020.

Murray is a Kentucky Colonel.

Filmography

Film

Television

Web series

References

External links 
 
 

1976 births
Living people
21st-century American comedians
American people of Irish descent
American people of Italian descent
Comedians from New York City
Georgetown University alumni
Monsignor Farrell High School alumni
People from Staten Island
The Tenderloins